This battle took place on 21 June 1655 inside the mouth of the Dardanelles Strait. It was a clear victory for Venice over the Ottoman Empire during the Cretan War.

The Venetians, under Lazzaro Mocenigo, continued their strategy of blockading the Dardanelles, to prevent the Ottomans from resupplying their forces in the Aegean Sea. The orders were the same as for the previous year - remain at anchor until the Ottoman fleet passed, then attack the rear - and this time the plan worked. The previous Kapudan Pasha (Grand Admiral), Kara Murat, had been promoted to Grand Vizier and his replacement, Kara Mustapha, had 36 sailing ships, 8 galleasses and 60 galleys, as well as perhaps several galleys from outside the Dardanelles. Once again, the Ottomans were arranged in 3 lines abreast: Sailing ships, then galleasses, then galleys. The Venetians had 26 sailing ships, 4 galleasses and 6 galleys.

As the Ottomans advanced, one galleass was sunk and one galley burnt and the rowing vessels retreated, after which the Venetians attacked the Ottoman sailing ships, resulting in 9 being burnt and 2 wrecked. The only Venetian loss was David Golia, which was burnt. Venetian casualties exclusive of the sunken ship were 126 killed and 180 wounded. 358 Ottomans were taken prisoner.

Ships involved

Venice (Lazzaro Mocenigo)
(most were hired from the Netherlands, Britain and France)
? ("capitana")
Aquila Coronata
Concordia
Profeta Samuel
Tomaso Francesco
Campo d'Oche
Principessa grande
Tre Re
Croce d'Oro
Sacrificio d'Abramo
Lepre Rosso
Principessa piccola
Corona
Gallo d'Oro
Ercole grande
Re David
Isabella Maria
David Golia (sunk)
Pesce Triglio
Ercole piccolo
Arma di Nassau
Lionessa
Arma di Lech
Sant' Antonio di Padova
Leon Negro
6 galleys
4 galleasses

Ottomans (Mustapha)
36 sailing ships - 9 burnt, 2 wrecked
8 galleasses - 1 sunk
60 galleys - 1 burnt

References

 

 
the Dardanelles 1655
Dardanelles 1655
History of the Dardanelles